Quitaúna is a train station, belonging to CPTM Line 8-Diamond, located in the municipality of Osasco.

History
Built by Estrada de Ferro Sorocabana (EFS) on 29 May 1929, in the district of Quitaúna. In 1934, the main building was renovated, due to the increase of commuter demand. With the installation of Brazilian Army Headquarters in the end of the 1930s and beginning of the 1940s, the station was renamed to Duque de Caxias, name used between 1939 and 1948. On 8 April 1953, the station receives a new building. In 1971, FEPASA absorbs EFS and rebuilts the station, reopened on 25 January 1979. In 1996, CPTM absorbs the old FEPASA West Line, renaming it to Line B-Grey. In March 2008, the line was renamed again to Line 8-Diamond.

References

External links
 CPTM Official Page (in Portuguese)

Companhia Paulista de Trens Metropolitanos stations
Railway stations opened in 1929